Ain't a Damn Thing Changed is the second studio album by American hip-hop duo Nice & Smooth. It was released on September 3, 1991, via Rush Associated Labels and Columbia Records. Recording sessions took place at Unique Recording Studios and Power Play Studios in New York City. Production was handled primarily by Gregg Nice and Smooth Bee, except song "Paranoia" produced by Louie Vega. Ain't a Damn Thing Changed spawned four singles: "Hip Hop Junkies", "How to Flow", "Cake & Eat It Too" and "Sometimes I Rhyme Slow".

Track listing

Chart history

References

External links

Nice & Smooth albums
1991 albums